Gentlemen for a Day is a Bulgarian comedy-drama film released in 1983, directed by Nikolay Volev, starring Todor Kolev and Itzhak Fintzi. The screenplay is written by Nikola Statkov based on his short stories “The Outlander” and “The Mister”.

The main character Purko (Todor Kolev) is a poor peasant with many children, constantly starting extravagant initiatives to get out of poverty during the hard times between the two world wars. The only consolation he finds in the music with his clarinet and his inborn musical talent until one day he meets an elegant couple from a town. They promise him prosperity if he mortgages his house and invests the money in their business.

This is the second out of three super hit films, featuring Todor Kolev in the leading role, released during the 1980s. The others are The Double (1980) directed also by Nikolay Volev and Dangerous Charm (1984) directed by Ivan Andonov. The performance by Kolev, with a reference to the great comedians of the silent cinema, received a broad critical acclaim.

Cast
Todor Kolev as Asparuh Kanchev - Purko
Itzhak Fintzi as the tax-collector 
Yordanka Stefanova as Purko's wife
Stoyan Gadev as the priest
Ivan Grigorov as Mito the barefooted (a fellow-villager) 
Nikola Pashov as the village mayor
Ivan Obretenov as a fellow-villager
Trifon Dzhonev as Bay Linko, the tavern-keeper
Veliko Stoyanov
Pavel Popandov
Georgi Mamalev as the engineer Kerkelezov (eccentric inventor)
Boris Radinevski
Kina Mutafova

References

Sources

External links
 
 King for a Day at the Bulgarian National Television 

1980s Bulgarian-language films
1983 films
1983 comedy-drama films
Bulgarian comedy-drama films
Films set in Bulgaria
Films shot in Bulgaria